Cape May Court House is an unincorporated community and census-designated place (CDP) located within Middle Township in Cape May County, in the U.S. state of New Jersey. It is part of the Ocean City metropolitan statistical area. As of the 2020 United States Census, the CDP’s population was 5,573, reflecting a 4.4% increase from the 5,338 enumerated at the 2010 U.S. census, in turn an increase of 13.5% from the 4,704 counted at the 2000 census. It is the county seat of Cape May County and serves as the principal administrative hub for the township. It constitutes part of the greater Philadelphia metropolitan area, or the Delaware Valley. 

Cape Regional Medical Center, known as Burdette Tomlin Memorial Hospital until April 2007, is the only hospital in Cape May County. The Cape May County Park and Zoo is also located in Cape May Court House.

History
Cape May Court House was laid out in 1703 by Jeremiah Hand and was first called Rumney Marsh and afterward Middleton before the adoption of its present name. The Court of Cape May County met in private homes and the First Baptist Church until 1764, when Daniel Hand set  of his own property to construct a courthouse and jail. It was replaced by the current structure in 1849.

Geography
According to the U.S. Census Bureau, the CDP had a total area of 9.899 square miles (25.639 km2), including 8.926 square miles (23.118 km2) of land and 0.973 square miles (2.520 km2) of water (9.83%).

Demographics

2010 census

The Census Bureau's 2006-2010 American Community Survey showed that (in 2010 inflation-adjusted dollars) median household income was $56,773 (with a margin of error of +/- $14,695) and the median family income was $73,618 (+/- $19,854). Males had a median income of $57,109 (+/- $11,100) versus $50,231 (+/- $6,373) for females. The per capita income for the CDP was $31,865 (+/- $4,296). About 0.9% of families and 3.0% of the population were below the poverty line, including 1.1% of those under age 18 and 4.9% of those age 65 or over.

2000 census
As of the 2020 U.S. census, there were 4,704 people, 1,732 households, and 1,221 families residing in the CDP. The population density was 202.3/km2 (524.1/mi2). There were 2,086 housing units at an average density of 89.7/km2 (232.4/mi2). The racial makeup of the CDP was 84.35% White, 10.88% African American, 0.19% Native American, 2.70% Asian, 0.06% Pacific Islander, 0.40% from other races, and 1.40% from two or more races. Hispanic or Latino of any race were 1.57% of the population.

There were 1,732 households, out of which 31.3% had children under the age of 18 living with them, 54.4% were married couples living together, 11.8% had a female householder with no husband present, and 29.5% were non-families. 24.9% of all households were made up of individuals, and 12.1% had someone living alone who was 65 years of age or older. The average household size was 2.56 and the average family size was 3.07.

In the CDP, the population was spread out, with 23.9% under the age of 18, 6.3% from 18 to 24, 25.8% from 25 to 44, 24.3% from 45 to 64, and 19.8% who were 65 years of age or older. The median age was 41 years. For every 100 females, there were 86.8 males. For every 100 females age 18 and over, there were 81.4 males.

The median income for a household in the CDP was $48,902, and the median income for a family was $56,707. Males had a median income of $39,848 versus $28,043 for females. The per capita income for the CDP was $21,541. About 5.3% of families and 7.0% of the population were below the poverty line, including 12.1% of those under age 18 and 4.4% of those age 65 or over.

Education

Middle Township Public Schools is the local school district for Middle Township: it operates Middle Township High School. All four schools and the district headquarters are in Cape May Court House CDP.

The Cape May County Technical School District operates Cape May County Technical High School which has a CMCH address, but is not within the CDP boundaries. Special needs students may be referred to Cape May County Special Services School District in Cape May Court House.

Areas in Dennis Township with Cape May Court House postal addresses, which are not in the CDP, are in Dennis Township Public Schools for K-8.

There is a private Christian K-12 school in Middle Township, Cape Christian Academy. It is in the CMCH CDP and has a CMCH postal address. Richard Degener of the Press of Atlantic City described it as being in Burleigh.

The Roman Catholic Diocese of Camden operates Bishop McHugh Regional School, a Catholic K–8 school, in Ocean View, Dennis Township, which has a Cape May Courthouse postal address. It is supported by four parishes in Cape May County including the Cape May Courthouse Church. The sole Catholic high school program in Cape May County is in Wildwood Catholic Academy (K–12) in North Wildwood, which also operates under the Camden Diocese.

Church Street Christian School, 18 months to preschool, is on the property of its sponsor, First United Methodist Church. It was formerly a Montessori school.

Cape May County Library has its Cape May Court House branch in the CDP.

Parks and recreation
The Cape May County Park & Zoo in Cape May Court House provides free year-round admission to a collection of over 550 animals representing 250 species in 85 acres of exhibits. The zoo is located in the center of Cape May County's Central Park, and together the zoo and the park cover about 220 acres. The zoo began operation in 1978. Its principal exhibit areas are a 57-acre African Savanna, a free-flight aviary, and a reptile collection.

The Clarence and Georgiana Davies Sports Complex includes basketball courts, soccer fields, and baseball fields.

The Middle Township Recreation Department hosts multiple sports comprised of indoor basketball courts, baseball fields, football fields and soccer fields.

Wineries
 Jessie Creek Winery
 Natali Vineyards

Notable people

People who were born in, residents of, or otherwise closely associated with Cape May Court House include:
 Kevin Bramble (born 1972), disabled ski racer, freeskier and monoski designer/builder.
 Daniel Cohen (1936–2018), children's writer  
 Joe Fala (born 1997), soccer player who has played as a defender for New York Red Bulls II in the USL Championship.
Jonathan F. Leaming (1822–1907) politician and physician.
 Matthew Maher (born 1984), retired soccer defender, who was sentenced to five and a half years in prison for first degree aggravated manslaughter and drunken driving.
 Matt Szczur (born 1989), Major League Baseball player for the San Diego Padres.
 Julius H. Taylor (1914–2011), professor emeritus at Morgan State University who was chairperson of the department of physics.

References

External links

 The Cape May County Gazette Local community newspaper
 The Gazette of Middle Township

Census-designated places in Cape May County, New Jersey
County seats in New Jersey
Middle Township, New Jersey